A cat café is a theme café whose attraction is cats who can be watched and played with. Patrons pay a cover fee, generally hourly, and thus cat cafés can be seen as a form of supervised indoor pet rental.
"Cat café" has been officially recognized in the online edition of the Oxford Dictionary of English since August 2015.

History
The world's first cat café, "Cat Flower Garden" (貓花園), opened in Taipei, Taiwan, in 1998 and eventually became a global tourist destination. The concept blossomed in Japan, where the first one named "Neko no Jikan" (lit. "Cat's Time") was opened in Osaka in 2004. Due to Japan's land size and population, many residents live in small apartments or condominiums which do not allow pets, making a cat café a very popular destination for young workers looking for the companionship and comfort offered. Tokyo's first cat café, named "Neko no mise" (Cat's Store), opened in 2005. After this, the popularity of cat cafés boomed in Japan. From 2005 to 2010, seventy-nine cat cafés opened across the country.

Controversy
In the United Kingdom animal charities disagree on whether cat cafés are a suitable environment for cats, with the RSPCA, Cats Protection and the Celia Hammond Animal Trust criticizing them for keeping large numbers of cats in a confined space with a revolving population of people. International Cat Care takes a more positive view, saying, "It is a difficult environment to get right but it's not impossible by any means." However, all the charities agree that cat cafés need to be properly regulated.

Asia

Japan

Cat cafés are quite popular in Japan, with Tokyo being home to 58 cat cafés . The popularity of cat cafés in Japan is attributed to many apartments forbidding pets, and to cats providing relaxing companionship in what may otherwise be a stressful and lonesome urban life. Other forms of pet rental, such as rabbit cafés, are also common in Japan.

There are various types of cat cafés in Japan. Some feature specific categories of cat such as black cats, fat cats, rare breed cats or ex-stray cats. Every cat café in Japan is required to obtain a license and comply with the strict requirements and regulations of the nation's Animal Treatment and Protection Law.

Japanese cat cafés feature strict rules to ensure cleanliness and animal welfare, in particular seeking to ensure that the cats are not disturbed by excessive and unwanted attention, such as by young children or when sleeping. Many cat cafés also seek to raise awareness of cat welfare issues, such as abandoned and stray cats and many often have cats from local animal shelters to help them lose any fear of humans and advertise them for possible adoption. From 2012 the cats could be displayed until 8 pm, but in 2016 the guidelines of the environment ministry state that they may visit and play with customers until 10 pm.

One café in Tokyo added goats as a way of having a unique element.

Singapore 
The first cat café in Singapore is Cat Café Neko no Niwa (Japanese for ‘Cat Garden’). There are at least five cat cafés in the city. The cat cafés are named Neko no Niwa, The Cat Café, The Company of Cats, Meomi Cat Café and Cuddles Cat Café. Neko no Niwa, The Company of Cats and The Cat Café feature cats who were rescued.

The Singaporean Cat Cafes are regulated and licensed by AVA and they are all bound to a 'code of conduct'. Individuals having questions with their cat needs, can join the Cat Welfare Society, which helps with medical fees, sterilization costs or adopting of the cats. Cat Cafes usually have their own/specific houserules.

Cuddles Cat Cafe was investigated by Agri-Food and Veterinary Authority of Singapore (AVA) in December 2014.

South Korea 
South Korea also has several cat cafés, most in Seoul, the capital city of South Korea. Cat cafés in South Korea have been very successful among both residents and tourists in South Korea. Customers can even adopt a cat at the cat cafés.

Taiwan 
Cats are popular pets in Taiwan, with the cat population increasing rapidly in recent years. The world's first cat café, named "Cat Flower Garden", opened in Taipei in 1998, where there is also a luxurious "Cathy Hotel" especially for cats. The Taiwanese cat café concept next spread to Japan, and later to most other countries around the world.

Thailand 
Thailand has several cat cafés, most in Bangkok. Cat Cafe by Dome, Cat Up Cafe, Caturday, Cataholic Cafe, The Coffee Cat, Mohu Mohu Cafe and Purr Cat Cafe Club are all located in Bangkok. Each serves baked goods with a small menu of main dishes and coffee and tea. Many have special pricing for petting time with a specific cat. Prices are usually higher than at most cafés but not unreasonably so. They all have rules regarding the behavior of guests towards the cats and often have purebred cats. Catmosphere Cat Cafe and Maewmoth cafés are located in Chiang Mai.

United Arab Emirates

There is a cat cafe in Umm Suqeim, Dubai. It was opened in 2018 by a local businesswoman.

Europe

Austria 

According to local legend, the world's first cat café opened in Vienna in the summer of 1912 and ceased operation approximately two years later. It is said that Vladimir Lenin was a regular for a period in 1913, finding the feline companionship a comfort during his time of exile. The cat café is known to have ceased operation shortly after the beginning of the First World War, although the much repeated story that the closure was due to its patriotic owner's donating all the cats to a factory making fur-lined boots for the war effort may be apocryphal. In 2012 cat café Neko was opened in Vienna.

Belgium 
Le Chat Touille opened up in Brussels in 2014. DreamCATchers opened in Ghent in 2017. The cats are rescued from shelters and rehabilitated, if necessary, with the aid of volunteers and a cat behavioural therapist. These cats are adopted by customers. It runs entirely off of donations and money customers spend in the café or on products from their sponsors.

Italy 
The first Italian cat café opened in Turin in March 2014; at first it hosted six cats. Its name is MiaGola Café, which in Italian can be interpreted as a language game: literally mia gola can be translated my gluttony, while miagola (stressed on the first syllable: miàgola) means (he or she) meows.

The Neko Cat Cafe was opened in Turin on 5 April 2014. The resident cats are all adopted from animal welfare organizations.

Lithuania
The cat café in Lithuania "Cat Cafe Kačių kavinė" opened in Vilnius in October 2014. Cat Cafe is located in center at Gedimino pr. 5. It is one of the biggest cafes with cats in the world. 15 cats live there.

Netherlands
The cat café Kopjes opened in Amsterdam in April 2015. In Groningen Kattencafé Op z'n Kop opened in February 2016 and cat café Poeslief opened in October 2016. The cat café Miespoes opened in Den Bosch in 2016, as did cat café Katdeau in Hengelo. In August 2016 kattencafé Ditjes & Katjes opened in The Hague. Shortly afterwards Pebbles opened its doors as the first cat café in Rotterdam. In 2017, the cat cafe Jippies opened in Haarlem. In 2018, the cat cafe De Familie Snorhaar opened in Breda.

Poland
"Kociarnia", the first cat café in Poland opened in Kraków in June 2015. The name is a combination of Polish words kocia (of a cat) and kawiarnia (a café).

A second cat café, "Miau Café", opened in Warsaw in January 2016. This is a coffee and cake cafe that is also a shelter for homeless cats. It has vegan items on the human menu. The Miau Café came to life thanks to the crowdfunding campaign on the Polish platform, wspieram.to where the 1 700 residents of Warsaw pulled in the financial resources to make the idea of the first cat café in Warsaw come true. 

In 2016, a cat café was opened in Lublin. After one day of activity it was closed by sanitary inspectors. It was the subject of many controversies in the local media. Eventually the conflict was settled and the cafe remains open.

Romania
Miau Cafe opened in Spring 2015 in Bucharest. The second cat café in Romania, La Pisici Cafe opened in September 2015 in Timișoara. A coffee house named Lady Cat also opened in Cluj-Napoca in March 2016.

Russia

The first cat cafe in Europe and in Russia "Cats Republic" was opened in the center of Saint Petersburg in 2011. 25 cats live there.

Slovakia 
The first cat café in Slovakia, Pradúce klbko (previously as "Cafe Cats klub") was opened in Martin in April 2015. The next one, Mačkafé opened in Bratislava in May 2015. The second one in Bratislava, Mačinézy opened in October 2015. A cat café named Mňaukafé also opened in Prešov in June 2017 as actually fourth in Slovakia. A Cat Café Club was opened in Poprad in February 2018.

Sweden 
The first cat café in Sweden was open in Stockholm in 2019 named Java Whiskers, with all cats open for adoption.

United Kingdom

England
The first British cat café opened in Totnes, Devon in June 2013. However it closed in May 2014 due to staff illness and the need to safeguard the owner's health.

In 2014 Lady Dinah's Cat Emporium opened to significant media attention and a two-month waiting list. 
Newcastle upon Tyne is home to Mog on The Tyne Cat Café, and Catpawcino. Nottingham has a cat café called Kitty Café. In 2015, several other UK cafes were in planning.

The Bag of Nails in Bristol is a cat pub, and has had as many as 24 cats.

A cat cafe opened in the Northern Quarter of Manchester on 30 July 2016.

The first cat café in Bournemouth, called Pause Cat Café, was opened in 2016. This was funded by a crowdfunding campaign and contains 12 resident rescue cats, in addition to promoting the rescuing of felines.

You&Meow, Bristol's first dedicated cat café opened in February 2017 after a successful crowdfunding campaign. It currently has 14 cats.

Paws For Thought Cat Cafe was opened in October 2018, and was the first cat café to open up in Hampshire. It has eight resident cats, which were rescued in the UK and in Romania.

Scotland
Maison de Moggy in Edinburgh is the first cat café in Scotland and opened in January 2015. Purrple Cat Cafe is planning to be Glasgow's first cat cafe, and was due to open in the summer of 2017 but was delayed due to prolonged works, until it was finally near the end of the year. In early 2017, another cat café had opened called Cats Meow Kittea Café in Stirling.

North America

Cat cafés have been spreading across North America since 2014. The goal in North America generally is to help get cats adopted by partnering with local cat rescues.

Canada

The first cat café to open in Canada was Le Café des Chats/Cat Café Montreal in Montreal, Quebec, Canada, which opened its doors to the public in August 2014. Café Chat L'Heureux (also in Montreal) opened in September 2014 with 8 cats adopted from local shelters.

Saturday, 17 October 2015 saw the opening of Ontario's first cat café, My Kitty Café, located in Guelph, Ontario.

The Siberian Cat Café opened in 2015 in Chelsea, Quebec. This cat café has only Siberian cats, making it the first hypoallergenic cat café in the world.

United States

In the United States, most health departments require special steps to separate the cafe area from area where the cats are housed. In some cases, this even extends to areas that cats pass through only briefly (e.g. an adopted cat must leave through a separate door without passing an area that prepares food).

Gaining regulatory approval can be difficult, as with KitTea of San Francisco. Starting the process in November 2013, KitTea's design was finally approved in August 2014 after extensive negotiation with San Francisco's Health Department. Oakland's Cat Town was the first cat cafe to open its doors to customers, signing a lease in July 2014 and opening just months later in October. These timelines highlight not only the regulatory hurdles for cat cafes that prepare food on premises, but also differences between local governments that are mere miles from one another.

In contrast to Japanese cat cafés, US cafes typically focus on adoptions. Within seven months of being open, Cat Town reported that "the euthanasia rate at its partner shelter has declined from 41 to 21 percent, and 184 cats have made the transition from the cafe's Cat Zone to permanent homes". Similarly, The Cat Cafe in San Diego has facilitated adoptions for more than 250 cats (January 2015 - October 2017) and KitTea of San Francisco has adopted 203 (June 2015 - February 2018).

In June 2015, Crumbs and Whiskers opened its first cat café in Washington, D.C., where it partnered with the local chapter of the Humane Society; this café provides a boarding space for around 15–25 cats at a time, all of which are provided by the Humane Society and made available for adoption. Crumbs and Whiskers subsequently opened its second café in Los Angeles, California in September 2016. In September 2015, a second café opened in New York City, called Koneko, supporting cats from Anjellicle Cats Rescue. In October 2015, the Blue Cat Cafe opened in Austin, Texas, partnering with the Austin Humane Society as a cafe and adoption center. It has live music. In December 2015, Seattle, Washington, opened its first cat café, called Seattle Meowtropolitan. In December 2015, the first cat cafe in Dallas, Texas—The Charming Cat Cafe—opened in Vista Ridge Mall, showcasing kitties from Kitty Save.

In March 2016, Cat Cafe Mad opened in Madison, Wisconsin, but was set to close the next year. In December 2016, Ashley Brooks opened "Pounce Cat Cafe + Wine Bar" in Charleston, South Carolina. Pounce has partnered with the largest animal shelter in South Carolina, Charleston Animal Society.

In 2017, The Cafe Meow became the first cat café to open in Minnesota, Tinker's Cat Café became the first cat café to open in Utah, and The Purrfect Roast became Chicago's first cat café. It has since shut down. In 2018, The Windy Kitty Cat Cafe opened in Chicago.

Also in 2017, in Grand Rapids, the Happy Cat Café became the first cat café in Michigan. Unlike most cat cafés, the Happy Cat Café requires that visitors schedule their visits ahead of time, and in large groups. They act as a cat themed party venue, with specialized events like cat yoga parties as well as more traditional events involving food and cats. Due to the COVID-19 pandemic, Happy Cat Café was shutdown for most of 2020, during which they performed renovations, and re-opened on January 2, 2021, but only for one-hour events for small groups.

Two cat cafes, Colony Cafe and The Black Cat Market, have opened in Pittsburgh. The Black Cat Market has experienced several of the regulatory issues outlined above. Columbus, Ohio was home to the Eat Purr Love Cat Cafe, which was open from 2016 to 2020, with Kitty Bubble Café opening in fall 2022. 

Naughty Cat Cafe opened in Chattanooga, TN in March 2019. They house 30 adoptable cats and visitors can enjoy coffee, tea and even beer while spending time with the cats.

See also
Animal cafe
 Call Me Kat, an American TV series whose lead character owns and operates a cat café
Petting zoo
List of Taiwanese inventions and discoveries

References

External links  

1998 introductions
Animals in entertainment
Types of coffeehouses and cafés
Cats in Japan
Japanese culture
Taiwanese inventions
Theme restaurants